Rock Therapy is the fourth studio album by American rockabilly band Stray Cats, released in August 1986 by EMI America. It was produced by Stray Cats. The album reached the No. 122 position on the Billboard 200 chart but failed to chart outside the U.S. Singles released from the album include "I'm a Rocker" and "Reckless". Rock Therapy was released as a reunion album after Setzer's solo effort, The Knife Feels Like Justice, and the trio of Phantom, Rocker and Slick self-titled LP.

Critical reception
Writing for People Weekly, critic Mary Shaughnessy contrasted Rock Therapy with the band members' solo albums predating it. Shaughnessy praised the album for bringing "renewed" vigor and exceeding the trio's separate efforts. Specifically calling out Setzer's guitar work as more inspired than his own solo album. Shaughnessy praised the production (done by the band without a separate producer) of this album over the previous Stray Cats albums and even against the then-current trend of "high-tech mush" in pop music. The Sun-Sentinels Kevin Davis wrote in his review that Rock Therapy is a "fun" album filled with "upbeat" songs. On the other hand, the Ottawa Citizens Evelyn Erskine found that compared to the band's previous work, the album "takes a more serious approach than usual to rockabilly." Greg Quill of the Toronto Star thought it was "probably the best Stray Cats album to date," despite being "recorded spontaneously and almost on a whim." In his review of the 2008 reissue of the album, The News-Presss Mark Marymont thought it was "all great fun and almost the equal of [the band's] first two best-sellers."

Track listing
All tracks composed by Brian Setzer; except where indicated
"Rock Therapy" (Alice Bayer, Glen Moore, Milton Subotsky)
"Reckless"
"Race with the Devil" (Gene Vincent, Sheriff Tex Davis)
"Looking for Someone To Love" (Buddy Holly, Norman Petty) 
"I Wanna Cry" (Slim Jim Phantom, Lee Rocker)
"I'm a Rocker" (Setzer, Slim Jim Phantom, Lee Rocker)
"Beautiful Delilah" (Chuck Berry)
"One Hand Loose" (Charlie Feathers, Jerry Huffman, Joe Chastain)
"Broken Man" (Setzer, Slim Jim Phantom, Lee Rocker)
"Change of Heart" (Setzer, Slim Jim Phantom, Lee Rocker)

Personnel
Brian Setzer - guitar, vocals
Lee Rocker - bass, vocals
Slim Jim Phantom - drums

References

1986 albums
Stray Cats albums
EMI America Records albums